James Albert Wales (30 August 1852 in Clyde, Ohio – 6 December 1886 in New York City) was a caricaturist. After leaving school, he apprenticed himself to a wood engraver in Toledo, but soon afterward went to Cincinnati, and thence to Cleveland, where he drew cartoons for the Leader during the presidential canvass of 1872. After working for some time in Chicago and Cleveland, he went to New York in 1873, and two years later secured an engagement on an illustrated newspaper. Afterward he was employed on Puck, in which some of his best works appeared. In 1881 he went abroad, and after his return he became one of the founders of Judge, and was for some time its chief cartoonist. 

He specialized in antisemitic attacks ridiculing Jews.  In 1882 he wrote about Jews in Judge:

They and their money already rule Europe, and it is only a question of time when they will do the same in our own country, and the world at large.

He returned to Puck in 1885, and continued his attacks on Jews. Wales was the only prominent caricaturist of the newer school who was born in America. He was clever at portraiture, and produced some excellent cartoons, according to contemporary scholarship.

Notes

References
 

American cartoonists
People from Clyde, Ohio
1852 births
1886 deaths